Yun Mi-jin (윤미진; born April 30, 1983) is an archer from South Korea who has won three Olympic gold medals and is a former world number one.  She holds the Olympic record for a women's 18-arrow match, at 173 out of a possible 180.  Yun set the record in Sydney, Australia at the 2000 Summer Olympics and matched it in 2004 in Athens, Greece.

In Sydney Yun placed 4th in the individual ranking round with a score of 661. In the first elimination round she beat Erika Reyes of Mexico 168-157. In the round of 32, she defeated Anna Karaseva of Belarus 162-152. In round 16, she broke the Olympic record in women's 18-arrow match in defeat of Alison Williamson of Great Britain 173 to 164.

In the quarterfinals, Yun defeated Natalia Bolotova of Russia 110-105 in a 12-arrow match, and in the semi-finals the eventual bronze-medalist and compatriot Kim Soo-nyung 107-105. In the final, she captured the gold by a mere point, when Yun defeated Kim Nam-soon 107-106.

In Athens, Yun placed 3rd in the women's individual ranking round with a 72-arrow score of 673.  In the first round of elimination, she faced 62nd-ranked Hanna Karasiova of Belarus.  Yun defeated Karasiova 162-155 in the 18-arrow match to advance to the round of 32.  In that round, she faced 35th-ranked Japanese archer Sayami Matsushita, defeating 173-149 and tying her own Olympic record for score in an 18-arrow match.  Yun then defeated 19th-ranked Jennifer Nichols of the United States 168-162, advancing to the quarterfinals.

In the quarterfinals, Yun faced Yuan Shu-chi of Chinese Taipei, losing to the 6th-ranked archer to end the Korean team's hopes of sweeping the medals.  The final score of 107-105 in the 12-arrow match placed Yun 5th overall in women's individual archery.

She competed in the 2002 Asian Games, where she won a gold medal in the team event and a bronze medal in the individual event, and at the 2006 Asian Games where she won a gold medal in the team event.

See also
List of South Korean archers
List of people of Korean descent
Yun (Korean name)
Gungdo

References

External links

1983 births
Living people
South Korean female archers
Archers at the 2000 Summer Olympics
Archers at the 2004 Summer Olympics
Olympic archers of South Korea
Olympic gold medalists for South Korea
Olympic medalists in archery
Asian Games medalists in archery
Archers at the 2002 Asian Games
Archers at the 2006 Asian Games
Medalists at the 2004 Summer Olympics
Medalists at the 2000 Summer Olympics
World Archery Championships medalists
Asian Games gold medalists for South Korea
Asian Games bronze medalists for South Korea
Medalists at the 2002 Asian Games
Medalists at the 2006 Asian Games
Universiade medalists in archery
Universiade silver medalists for South Korea
Medalists at the 2005 Summer Universiade